This is a list of tennis players who have represented the Germany Davis Cup team in an official Davis Cup match. Germany have taken part in the competition since 1913. The team was known as West Germany from 1961 to 1990.

Germany/West Germany players

Last updated after the 2023 Davis Cup qualifying round.

References

Lists of Davis Cup tennis players
Davis